The 6th IPC Ice Sledge Hockey World Championships took place in the Hamar Olympic Amphitheatre in Hamar, Norway from March 24, 2012 to April 1, 2012. It was the first time that Norway hosted the IPC Ice Sledge Hockey World Championships. In the final, the United States defeated Korea 5-1, to win their second title since 2009.

See also
2012 Men's World Ice Hockey Championships

References

World Ice Hockey Championships - Men's
2012
World Para Ice Hockey Championships
World
Sport in Hamar
March 2011 sports events in Europe
April 2011 sports events in Europe